"Ojuelegba" is a song by Nigerian singer Wizkid from his self-titled second studio album, Ayo (2014). It was written by Wizkid and produced by the record producing duo Legendary Beatz. The song shares its title with the metropolitan subsection of Lagos Mainland. It highlights Wizkid's struggles as an underground artist, who roamed the streets of Ojuelegba to support his recording interest. The song received numerous airplay on all major radio stations in Nigeria, and peaked at number 1 on Capital Xtra's Afrobeats Chart for February 2015. The official remix of "Ojuelegba" features vocals by Canadian rapper Drake and English grime artist Skepta. It made its premiere on OVO Sound Radio in July 2015. The song was ranked 12th on The Faders list of the 107 Best Songs of 2015. Prior to the release of the official remix, Ghanaian rapper Sarkodie released his rendition of "Ojuelegba".

Music video

Background
The accompanying music video for "Ojuelegba" was directed by Clarence Peters, and uploaded to YouTube on 5 January 2015. The video features a scene of a bus conductor calling out to passengers to board his vehicle to Ojuelegba; Wizkid is seen boarding the bus. B-roll scenes of Ayilara and Itire roads were also included in the cut. The video depicts the dramatic and realistic perspective of community life in Ojuelegba. It also story-lines Wizkid's upbringing in the town of Ojuelegba and highlights his journey from grass to grace. Moreover, the video portrays the message of goodwill and family support needed to ascend during times of hardship.

Reception
Critical reception to the music video was mixed. Joey Akan of Pulse Nigeria said the video is not a true representation of the song because it lacks inspiration. On the contrary, Joda Afolabi of 
Nigerian Entertainment Today commended Clarence Peters for shooting the video and said it "depicts a thorough and true reflection of what the song preaches."  Bukola Adegunle of Royal Times gave the video 3 out of 5 stars, adding: "creativity was displayed, which gave meaning to the video. The scenes were well arranged and there was a great link in all the scenes." Jim Donnett and Jimmy King both gave the video a 3.8 rating, saying its simplistic factor stood out.

Live performances
Wizkid performed the song along with "Jaiye Jaiye" at the Indigo 02 Arena in London on 26 September 2014.

Accolades
"Ojuelegba" won Song of the Year and was nominated for Best Pop Single at The Headies 2015. It won Hottest Single of the Year at the 2015 Nigeria Entertainment Awards.

Personnel
Song credits
Writing - Ayodeji Balogun
Production - Legendury Beatz

Video credits 
Director - Clarence Peters

References

External links

2014 songs
Wizkid songs
Song recordings produced by Legendury Beatz
Yoruba-language songs
Songs written by Wizkid